The Šubić family was one of the Twelve noble tribes of Croatia and a great noble house which constituted Croatian statehood in the Middle Ages. They held the county of Bribir (Varvaria) in inland Dalmatia. From them branched prominent Zrinski family.

History

Origins
Today Bribir is an archaeological site in inland Dalmatia. It is located on a flat hill about fifteen kilometres northwest of Skradin, near the old Zadar road which goes through Benkovac. Under the steep rocks of its western side there is the source of the Bribirčica stream and from here the rich and fertile Bribir-Ostrovica field spreads out. The hill of Bribir, an ideal place to control the surrounding territory, was a perfect area to inhabit. The one who held it had control over all roads and approaches from the sea to the hinterland, making it an ideal settlement.

During the Roman period Bribir, known as Varvaria, had the status of municipium and was the centre of one of the fourteen Liburnian counties. The Byzantine emperor Constantine Porphyrogenitus wrote in the 10th century about the Croats settling in Dalmatia in the 7th century and described how they had organised their country into eleven counties (zupanias) one of which was Breberi, centred on site of the old Varvaria (Moravcsik & Jenkins, eds. 1967). A line of hills separated it from the territory of Knin to the north and to the south it bordered on Skradin. It was held by a kindred that in coeval documents is referred to as nobiles, comites or principes Breberienses (nobles, counts or rulers of Breber, "knezovi Bribirski" in Croatian). These Breberienses belonged to the Šubić tribe from Luka županija, one of the twelve tribes which composed Croatian statehood in the Middle Ages, and according to the Supetar Cartulary, they were one of six tribes which selected bans who, in turn, elected a new king in a case where the prior king died without leaving heirs. In 1182 was mentioned noble Tolimir filius Stephani Subici in the hinterland of Zadar, in 1248 some noble Subinich were on the island of Krk, while Mladen III Banić (1342) and Paul III Banić (1345) were first members of the main line of Bribir to be called seu generationis Subichievich.

Original coat of arms
The original coat of arms of this clan of nobles is a wing argent on a shield gules. The crest is a sprig of barberry. Argent and gules were the colours of the Croatian kindreds that sided with the papal party such as the lords of Krk (before they took on the shield of the Roman Frangipani), the Gusić, the Mogorović and the Hrvatinić, and still are those of Croatia.

The device could be derived from the winged shield standard of the royal chamberlain, a post held by Budez postelnic berberensis jupanus (1069). Wings are common, especially as a crest, in later Croatian heraldry. This could be accounted by the numerous familiares of the powerful Zrins who kept the Breber device in their coat of arms.

Timeline
In recent history books whenever members of this kindred are mentioned in relation to their prominent role in the 13th and 14th centuries the surname of Šubić is conferred upon them by the historian. This was not the way that the members called themselves at the time. During the Middle Ages every man in Croatia bore four names: the name given at baptism, the patronym, the name of his kindred which was also the name of the settlement in which he lived, and his tribal affiliation (Jirecek, 1967). When, with the introduction of feudalism, king Bela confirmed the kindred in their possession of Breber (1251) this name would again be used to identify them since by then the custom was to be called after one's premier fief. Thus, in the period from 1069 to the destruction of the county by the Turks in 1520, the many personages of the clan that emerge from the original Latin documents qualify themselves as de Breberio preceded by their Christian name and patronym; only rarely do they add their tribal affiliation.

The seal of Paul I Šubić of Bribir (born in 1312), the greatest figure of the clan, has the following lettering on it:  + S(IGILLVM) PAVLI BREBERIENSIS BANI TOCIVS SCLAVONIEAnother seal of the same man has: PAVLVS DE BREBERIO BANVS CROATORVM D[OMI]N[V]S ET BOSNEThus, in the vulgar the surname would be Breber or some variant (Breberić, Brebrić, Barbier, Barber, Barberich, etc.). The 19th century erudite Croatian historians who wrote the first history books for the public opted for Šubić which, in the ardent nationalistic spirit of the time, sounded reassuringly Slavic as compared to Breber. 

During the 13th and 14th centuries Brebers were many times called to cover the post of count in the townships of Split, Trogir, Skradin and Omiš, primarily clashing with Domald of Sidraga, Kačić and Nelipić family. In the documents, it is possible to identify six different branches of the Breber clan. The most illustrious of which is the one descended from iupanus Miroslaus Brebriensis, filius Bogdanizi (1184). His great-grandson Paul, mentioned above, reached the peak of power towards the end of the 13th century. He was Ban of Croatia and Dalmatia, his rule extended to Bosnia, and with his brothers he controlled the maritime cities of Dalmatia. In these regions he was champion of the Pope and was instrumental in placing Charles, the firstborn of the King of Naples, on the throne of Hungary and Croatia. He was related to the King of Naples, the King of Serbia, the Da Camino lords of Treviso, and the Tiepolo and Dandolo patricians of Venice. When he died in 1312, his eldest son Mladen tried to maintain the hold over the other Croatian clans, but was unsuccessful and bit by bit lost land, castles and towns.

Decline
Besides these particular offshoots which went their separate ways, a numerous kin continued to abide by the ancient holding of Breber. In 1324 when the citizenship of Zadar was conferred on the nobiles domini de Briberio, 190 members of the clan presented themselves for the investiture. In 1353 the Ottoman Turks crossed the Dardanelles and began their invasion of Europe. In the 15th century Bosnia was already a pashalik from where raids would be carried into Croatia-Dalmatia. The feudal levies and the clan warriors had no hope against the Turkish war machine and met their fate in the battle of Krbavsko Polje (1493). The castle of Breber was caught on the front between the Turkish, Hungarian and Venetian armies and by 1520 had become a desolate waste of rubble. Last news giving the comites Breberienses still in their ancient seat is in the diocesan synod of Skradin held at the time of bishop Archangel (1490–1502). The Turkish terror displaced large portions of the population of Dalmatia-Croatia. Some sought refuge in the cities of the coast, some crossed the sea to Italy, others, especially those belonging to the nobility, resettled to the north in that part of Slavonia still under the crown of Hungary-Croatia. Their clan organisation definitely disrupted, the single Breber families settled in various places in the county of Zagreb (Comitatus Zagrabiensis) (Adamcek & Kampus, 1976). In the second half of the 16th century we find one nucleus settled in Turopolje (Campus Zagrabiensis) where they joined the free community of lesser nobles (nobiles unius sessionis). Another group established itself at Stubica and other places in the Zagorje region, where one branch, the counts Jankovic Bribirsky, owned the Horvatska manor in the 17th century and remained one of the prominent local families till the 20th century. Breber families are still living in these places to this day.

Zrinski branch

In 1347 King Louis I of Hungary conferred on this branch of the Brebers, in the persons of Count Gregory and Count George (Grgur and Juraj in Croatian), respectively son and nephew of Ban Paul, the Zrin Castle (in exchange for the strategically important castle of Ostrovica, their last holding outside of ancestral Bribir. This branch would be known by the surname of Zrin (but also variously a Zrinio, Zrinski, Zrínyi, Zrini, de Serin, Sdrin following Latin, contemporary Croatian, Hungarian, French, or Italian usage) which rose to its height of fame and glory with Count Nikola IV (1508–1566), the hero of Szigetvár, and with Count Nikola VII  (1620–1664), the Scourge of the Ottomans.

Mark Forstall (or Marcus Forstall), the secretary of the latter, compiled a history of the Zrins, tracing it back to the Brebers, to the tribe of Šubić, and from there to the Roman gens Sulpicia which, according to Suetonius, sprang from the love of Zeus for Pasiphaë. Even the illustrious erudite Charles Ducange (1610–1688) mentions these fabulous origins in his Illyrici Veteris et Novi, p. 237:Dynastae in Zrinio magno semper in Dalmatia, et in Croatia potentatu gaudebant, primum ante anno 1347. Breberiensium, deinde Zriniorum nomine cogniti: Comites Breberienses ex antiquo Sulpitorum Romanorum genere orti, Subich a Dalmatis patrio cognominabantur sermone.A feeling for classical antiquity was a cultural feature of the Renaissance and the wish to establish a link with the great tradition of Rome was a common vanity of those times. The claim of the Zrins, however, is not totally groundless. During the times of the Roman Empire, Dalmatia was a senatorial province and would have affiliations with the patrician families of the capital. P. Sulpicius Rufus was governor of Illyricum around 45 B.C. and could have established a settlement of clientes here, as was the general custom during Roman rule. Varvaria was a Roman municipium under Italic law but was actually enrolled in the tribe Claudia. Archaeological evidence at Bribir shows no sign of interruption of human occupation between the Roman municipium and the arrival of the Croats. This belonging of the Breberienses to the universe of Rome is revealed by their emergence to power in the time when Croatia was placed under papal suzerainty during the reign of Zvonimir (1075–1089), and also when later they bitterly fought and defeated (1227) the Kacic kindred, champions of the heretical party. And later still when the Pope would address ban Mladen as dilectus filius (1319). Other kindreds and families in Croatia and Dalmatia like the Karin, the Babonić, the Frankopan, the Gusić and some of the patrician families from the maritime cities also claimed a similar link with Rome.

The greatness of the house of Zrin ended with the brothers Nikola VII and Peter, the latter having been condemned to the scaffold in the famous trial of Vienna (1671) regarding the Zrinski-Frankopan conspiracy. The last counts, Adam and John Anthony (Croatian: Ivan Antun), lost the previous power of the family; the former fell in the cavalry charge against the Turks at Slankamen in 1691 and the latter, after having brilliantly fought against the French, fell into disgrace and died in prison in 1703.

Notable members 
The following members of the family were most notable:
 Nikola IV Zrinski (also Nikola IV), Ban of Croatia between 1542 and 1556
 Juraj IV Zrinski, main royal treasurer
 Juraj V Zrinski, Ban of Croatia between 1622 and 1626
 Nikola VII Zrinski, Ban of Croatia between 1647 and 1664
 Petar Zrinski (also Petar IV), Ban of Croatia between 1665 and 1670
 Katarina Zrinska, poet and wife of Petar Zrinski
 Jelena Zrinska, Katarina's daughter and wife of Francis I Rákóczi

Count Nikola IV Zrinski (born 1508) was the Ban of Dalmatia, Slavonia and Croatia, the commander of Szigetvár (from 1561) and the Habsburg commander in western Hungary (from 1563).  He is considered the most courageous and prominent member of the Zrinski family, which together with the Frankopans was the most distinguished and famous noble family in  Croatian history. He established his reputation as a fearless warrior in the defense of Vienna in 1529, and in the victory over the Turks at Buda in 1529. As Croatian Ban, he persistently advocated Croatian interests. He acquired immortal fame for himself and Croatia in the Battle of Szigetvár in 1566.  More than 100,000 well-armed Turks, headed by the famed Suleiman the Magnificent and Grand Vizier Sokollu Mehmet Pasha, besieged the fortress of Szigetvár from August 7 to 7 September 1566. Zrinski, with "two thousand three hundred and a few more" warriors defended it, until the charge from the fortress, in which he was killed. The Sultan offered Zrinski the crown of Croatia in vain. The destiny of Europe was at stake then, and Zrinski and his company of Croatian knights chose to defend the interests of the Christian West. Sultan Suleiman died during the battle.  After this the Grand Vizier abandoned that military expedition and returned to Constantinople.

Nikola's IV son, George IV (Croatian: Juraj IV) inherited his father's property. He was more interested in books than in chivalry. He became enthusiastic about Lutheranism which he did not accept, but forced the people to turn Protestant. He persecuted Catholic priests and devastated a number of the churches, especially the famous Paulist monastery at Sveta Jelena, which did him no credit among the people. But on the other hand, he founded the first printing office at Nedelišće (near Čakovec) in 1574, when there was no other printing office in Croatia.

His son, George V (Croat. Juraj V) turned back to Catholicism and "purified" Međimurje from Lutheranism. Unfortunately his chivalry and rapier-tonguedness were a thorn in his superior's, general Albrecht von Wallenstein's, side and von Wallenstein had George poisoned after a verbal duel in 1626.

Other branches
Count Martino Zrinski or Sdrigna, was born in 1462 and was the son of Count Peter II and brother of Nikola III, father of Nikola IV, the one who is referred to in history as Nikola the Great Zrinski of Siget (Szigetvár in Hungarian).

Martino Zrinski was the first member of the Zrinski family to live in Cefalonia, Greece.  He adopted the name of Sdrin or Sdrinia. 
 
Another branch of the Breber clan, descended from Peter living at the beginning of the 14th century, owed its rise to having remained unshakeably loyal to Sigismund of Luxemburg, the future Holy Roman Emperor (1411), in his struggle for the crown of Hungary-Croatia against King Ladislaus of Naples. Nikola, James and John, nobiles de Breberio, were confirmed in their possessions.  James was nominated Viceban.  The family also received the castle of Perna with all the appurtenances. This family was then known as Perényi (Peranski in Croatian, or Peransky, de Perén, a Pernya in other languages) and was numbered among the magnates of Hungary up to the 20th century. Gabriel Perényi and bishop Francis Perényi fell fighting in the fateful Battle of Mohács (29 August 1526).
Another family branch that rose to wealth and power were the descendants of Ugrinus (died 1335). Known under the nickname of Melić, then Melith, which later became their surname, they obtained vast estates in Transylvania.

Members of the House of Šubić

Stjepko Šubić, Count of Trogir
Pavao I Šubić of Bribir (1245–1312), Count of Bribir, Ban of Croatia and Lord of all Bosnia
Mladen II Šubić of Bribir (1270–1343), Count of Bribir, Ban of Croatia, Ban of Bosnia  and Lord of the all Bosnia
Juraj II Šubić of Bribir (1275–1330), Count of Bribir and Split, ruled from Klis Fortress
Pavao III Šubić of Bribir (?–1356), married Catherina Dandolo from Venice
Katarina Šubić, married Ivan Jurišić Bribirski
Deodat Šubić (?–1348) 
Mladen III Šubić of Bribir (1315–1348), "Shield of the Croats", ruled from Klis Fortress, married Jelena Nemanjić, a daughter of Stephen Uroš III of Serbia
Mladen IV Šubić of Bribir
Senko Šubić of Bribir
Radics
Bielak
Katarina Šubić (?–1358), married Duke of Legnica-Brzeg Bolesław III the Generous in 1326.
Jelena Šubić (1306–1378), married to Vladislaus of Bosnia, regent of medieval Bosnia.
Pavao II Šubić of Bribir (?–1346), Count of Trogir and Ostrovica, married Elizabeth Frankopan (Elizabeta Krčka)
Juraj III Šubić of Bribir (Juraj I Zrinski) (?–1362)
Elizabeth, married Tamás of Corbavia
Pavao (1414)
Pribko
Katharina, a nun
Grgur I Šubić of Bribir, Count of Šibenik
Juraj I Šubić of Bribir (1277–1302), Count of Trogir, Šibenik, Omiš and Nin, ruled from Klis Fortress
Ivan (1358)
Mladen I Šubić of Bribir (?–1304), Count of Split, Ban of Bosnia (Dominus of Bosnia), ruled from Klis Fortress after George I death
Stanislava Šubić (?–1304), a nun
a daughter (1330–?), married to Jacopo Tiepolo

See also
Šubić family tree
Croatian nobility
List of noble families of Croatia
Twelve noble tribes of Croatia
List of rulers of Croatia
List of rulers of Bosnia
History of Croatia

References

List of consulted works
 The expanding Šubić family, the princes of Bribir, in the book Southeastern Europe in the Middle ages, 500-1250 - Author: Florin Curta
 Croatian scientific bibliography: Supporting the Angevin pretenders - the Šubić of Bribir and installation of the Angevins in the Kingdom of Hungary-Croatia - Author: Damir Karbi
 Princes of Bribir in the medieval Croatian state
 Croatian noblemen of Šubić, the princes of Bribir, in the book Croatia, Bosnia and Herzegovina and the Serbian claims - Author: Martin Davorin Krmpotić
 Princes of Bribir in the Croatian history, chapter The Extinction of the Arpad Dynasty - Author: Marko Marelić
 Epitaph of Mladen III Šubić, prince of Bribir
 Rady M. 2000. Nobility, Land and Service in Medieval Hungary. Palgrave ed. 231 pp.

Further reading

External links

 

 
Medieval Croatian nobility
Croatian noble families
Banate of Bosnia
Hungarian nobility